Justin Grant Skule (born November 23, 1996) is an American football offensive tackle for the Tampa Bay Buccaneers of the National Football League (NFL). He played college football at Vanderbilt. He was drafted by the San Francisco 49ers in the sixth round of the 2019 NFL Draft.

High school career 
Skule was a two-year starting left tackle for Centreville High School. Skule played in two state championships winning one in 2013. As a three-star lineman, Skule committed to Vanderbilt. He also received offers from Navy, West Virginia, Rutgers, and Virginia.

College career 
Skule was nearly a four-year starter on the offensive line for Vanderbilt, missing only five games in his freshman season due to an injury. He was named to the Freshman SEC Academic Honor Roll his first year, and then the SEC Academic Honor Roll his second and third years.

Professional career

San Francisco 49ers
Skule was drafted by the San Francisco 49ers in the sixth round (183rd overall) of the 2019 NFL Draft. Skule helped the 49ers reach Super Bowl LIV, but they lost 31-20 to the Kansas City Chiefs. Skule played in all 16 games in 2020, starting 4 of them.

On June 7, 2021, Skule suffered a torn ACL during practice, ending his 2021 season. He was waived/injured on June 11, and reverted to the team's injured reserve list on June 14.

On August 30, 2022, Skule was released by the 49ers.

Tampa Bay Buccaneers
On September 21, 2022, Skule was signed to the Tampa Bay Buccaneers practice squad. He was released on October 18, then re-signed on November 2. He signed a reserve/future contract on January 17, 2023.

References 

1996 births
Living people
American football offensive linemen
People from Clifton, Virginia
Players of American football from Virginia
San Francisco 49ers players
Sportspeople from Fairfax County, Virginia
Tampa Bay Buccaneers players
Vanderbilt Commodores football players